Hasse Mikael Sjöö (born 17 December 1959) is a retired professional Swedish ice hockey player. He played for Västra Frölunda IF and HV71 in Elitserien.

References 

1959 births
Frölunda HC players
HV71 players
Living people
Swedish ice hockey forwards